Inoussa Dangou is a Beninese Olympic javelin thrower. He represented his country in the men's javelin throw at the 1980 Summer Olympics. His distance was a 63.56.

References

Living people
Male javelin throwers
Olympic athletes of Benin
Athletes (track and field) at the 1980 Summer Olympics
Beninese male athletes
Year of birth missing (living people)